Agrim Tiwari (born 14 April 1996) is an Indian cricketer. He made his first-class debut on 27 January 2020, for Uttarakhand in the 2019–20 Ranji Trophy. He made his Twenty20 debut on 18 January 2021, for Uttarakhand in the 2020–21 Syed Mushtaq Ali Trophy. He made his List A debut on 1 March 2021, for Uttarakhand in the 2020–21 Vijay Hazare Trophy.

References

External links
 

1996 births
Living people
Indian cricketers
Uttarakhand cricketers
Place of birth missing (living people)